Mark Fyodorovich Poltoratsky (April 28, 1729, Sosnitsa, Kiev Governorate – April 24, 1795, Saint Petersburg) was a Russian Imperial singer (baritone) of Ukrainian Cossack descent and an Active State Councillor of Russia. He is the founder of the Russian noble family of Poltoratsky.

Biography
Father – Cossack Fyodor Poltoratsky – settled in the centenary town of Sosnitsa of the Chernigov Regiment of the Hetman's Ukraine and accepted the priesthood. During the period of the hetmanship of Daniel Apostle, on April 28, 1729, son Mark was born in Fyodor Poltoratsky's family. The boy grew up clever, inquisitive, and his father identified him in the "Latin schools" of Chernigov, in which he studied for four years.

Then his studies continued within the walls of the Kiev-Mogila Academy. Since childhood, Mark had a beautiful voice and, as a student, he sang in an academic choir.

In 1744, Mark’s voice was heard by Count Alexei Razumovsky (himself a former chorister), who accompanied Empress Elizabeth Petrovna on her trip to Ukraine. A year later, the young man left his Kiev classmates and decided to go to St. Petersburg for the singing service in the choir at the imperial court. Mark's career was developing successfully, he was soon appointed as the "installer" of the court choir.

In 1750 he was the first of the Slavs enlisted in the Italian opera troupe, acted under the name "Marko Porturatsky". Three years later he was appointed regent of the Court Singing Chapel. With nominal decrees of the Empress, he repeatedly traveled to select the best voices to Ukraine. In 1754 he was promoted to colonel.

Mark Poltoratsky selected the "small singers", listening to church, monastic, school and other choirs in the hetman's regiments. Dmitry Bortniansky, 9 years old, the son of a Cossack of the Glukhovsky Hundreds of the Nezhinsky Regiment, got into the register of "small singers" of October 30, 1760.

In 1763, Poltoratsky headed the Court Singing Chapel; in the same year he received hereditary nobility. He died in St. Petersburg and was buried at the Lazarevskoe Cemetery of the Alexander Nevsky Lavra.

Manors
In the 1740s, Poltoratsky acquired the village of Gruziny in the Novotorzhsky Uyezd of the Tver Province. The main house with outbuildings, a service building, a forge, a cellar, a boulder bridge, a landscape park, and stone residential peasant houses (21 houses) have been preserved from the Poltoratsky estate.

In 1790, the Transfiguration Church, a fairly exact replica of the Chesme Church in the capital, was founded by state councilor Mark Fedorovich Poltoratsky in the village of Krasnoye, Staritsky Uyezd, Tver Province.

Family
The first marriage Poltoratsky was married to the daughter of a rich merchant Shemyakin. Widowed, he married the daughter of poor nobles of the Tver Province, Agafokleya Shishkova (June 29, 1737 – October 12, 1822), which was not yet 15 years old at the time. She "skillfully disposed of enormous wealth and large economy, holding her servants, kin and a bunch of already married children in her fists". Anna Kern remembered that her grandmother did not know how to read or write, but at the same time was "intelligent and responsive". The family had 22 children who were part of the Poltoratsky family.

References

Ukrainian people in the Russian Empire
1729 births
1795 deaths
18th-century opera singers from the Russian Empire
Baritones
Mark
Burials at Lazarevskoe Cemetery (Saint Petersburg)
Russian landowners
18th-century landowners